Sergio "Sergi" Guardiola Navarro (born 29 May 1991) is a Spanish professional footballer who plays as a forward for Cádiz CF on loan from Real Valladolid.

Club career

Early career
Born in Manacor, Majorca, Balearic Islands, Guardiola was a product of Lorca Deportiva CF's youth system, and made his debut as a senior in the 2009–10 season, in Tercera División. In summer 2010, he signed with Segunda División B club Jumilla CF.

In February 2012, Guardiola moved to CF La Nucía in the fourth division. On 1 August, he joined third-tier side Ontinyent CF, moving to Getafe CF B in the same league on 12 January 2013.

Eldense and Alcorcón
On 12 July 2014, Guardiola signed for CD Eldense after scoring nine goals in the 2013–14 campaign while playing for Novelda CF. On 14 May of the following year, he agreed to a three-year deal with AD Alcorcón, which was made effective on 1 July.

Guardiola made his professional debut on 22 August 2015, coming on as a second-half substitute for Óscar Plano in a 2–0 Segunda División home win against Córdoba CF. On 24 December, after being rarely used, he terminated his contract.

Barcelona B and offensive tweets
On 28 December 2015, Guardiola signed a one-and-a-half year deal with FC Barcelona, being assigned to its reserves in division three. However, just hours later, he was released after the discovery of offensive tweets about the club and Catalonia made in 2013. He claimed they were made by a friend as a joke, and that he had not noticed they had been posted.

Granada
On 8 January 2016, Guardiola joined another reserve side from the same league, Club Recreativo Granada, for the remainder of the campaign. He made his debut later that day, putting his team ahead with a penalty kick in a 1–1 draw at CD San Roque de Lepe.

Guardiola was promoted to Granada CF's first team by new manager Paco Jémez in July 2016, appearing regularly during the pre-season and also being an unused substitute in the opening game of the new season against Villarreal CF. However, after the arrival of new signings, he was deemed surplus to requirements and was loaned to A-League club Adelaide United FC on 13 September 2016.

On 27 January 2017, Guardiola moved to Real Murcia also in a temporary deal.

Córdoba
On 2 July 2017, Guardiola signed a two-year contract with second-division side Córdoba after cutting ties with Granada. On 20 December, he scored a hat-trick in a 5–0 home rout of CF Reus Deportiu.

On 13 March 2018, Guardiola agreed to a four-year extension at the Andalusians, raising his release clause to €15 million. On 22 June, after netting 22 goals and narrowly avoiding relegation, he signed a one-year loan deal with Getafe CF in La Liga.

Guardiola made his debut in the Spanish top flight on 31 August 2018, replacing Ángel late into the 0–0 home draw with Real Valladolid.

Valladolid
On 25 January 2019, Valladolid reached an agreement with Córdoba for the transfer of Guardiola, who signed a contract until 2023. He scored eight league goals in 35 appearances during the 2019–20 season, his best input in the top tier.

On 31 August 2021, after Valladolid's relegation, Guardiola was loaned to Rayo Vallecano also in the main division. Back to Valladolid for the 2022–23 campaign, with the side back in the top flight, he played 15 goalless matches before joining Cádiz CF of the same league on loan on 31 January 2023, with a conditional obligatory buyout clause.

Career statistics

References

External links

1991 births
Living people
Sportspeople from Manacor
Spanish footballers
Footballers from Mallorca
Association football forwards
La Liga players
Segunda División players
Segunda División B players
Tercera División players
Lorca Deportiva CF footballers
Ontinyent CF players
Getafe CF B players
Novelda CF players
CD Eldense footballers
AD Alcorcón footballers
FC Barcelona Atlètic players
Club Recreativo Granada players
Granada CF footballers
Real Murcia players
Córdoba CF players
Getafe CF footballers
Real Valladolid players
Rayo Vallecano players
Cádiz CF players
A-League Men players
Adelaide United FC players
Spanish expatriate footballers
Expatriate soccer players in Australia
Spanish expatriate sportspeople in Australia